Su Manshu (1884–1918) was a Chinese writer, poet, painter, revolutionist, and translator. His original name was Su Xuanying, Su had been named  as a writer of poetry and romantic love stories in the history of early modern Chinese literature. But he was most commonly known as a Buddhist monk, a poetry monk, "the monk of sentiment” (pinyin: qing seng; simplified Chinese: 情僧), and “the revolutionary monk” (pinyin: gem-ing seng; simplified Chinese: 革命僧). Su was born out of wedlock in Yokohama, Japan in 1884. His father was a Cantonese merchant, and his mother was his father's Japanese maid. His ancestral home was in Zhongshan city, Guangdong Province, China.  He died at the age of 34 due to a stomach disease in Shanghai.

Life and career

Education 
Su had a good master of painting and language. He mastered many languages — English, French, Japanese and Sanskrit. In 1896, he went to Shanghai with his uncle and aunt to study in the British con-cession when he was thirteen years old. Later, in 1898, he went to Japan to study at the School of Universal Harmony (Da Tong School 大同學校) in Yokohama, Japan. In 1902, he continued to study in the special program for Chinese students at Waseda University ( 早稻田大學 ).

Buddhism 
He became a Buddhist monk three times during his life; once at the age of 12 in 1895, later in 1899, and again in 1903, and adopted Su Manshu as a Buddhist name.  He studied in Japan and traveled to many Buddhist countries including India, and Java.  In 1895, Su fell ill and nearly died due to neglect of care from his family, which resulted in him resorting Buddhism. However, Su did not follow the rules of Buddhism so he was expelled. In 1898, Su suffered a serious setback in his romantic relationship with a Japanese girl named Jingzi. Jinzi's family forced her to leave Su, but she could not bear the great pressure and soon died. After facing the suffering, Su resorted to Buddhism again as a spiritual consolation for a short period. In 1913, Su felt disappointed about the political and social status, which the Qing government perpetually banned anti-government remarks in the revolutionary newspaper. So he returned to the temple in Guangdong for the rest of his life.

Career 
Su was the most famous prose translator and his masterworks include Selected poems of Byron and Les Miserables. In 1903, he serialized his incomplete translation of Les Miserable World  in The China National Gazette  ( 國民日日報 ) and then published it in 1904. Su also translated quite a few poems by foreign romantic poets from Lord Byron and then published a collection of the translations entitled Selected Poems of Byron (拜倫詩選) in 1908.  In 1911, some of these translations were published again in an anthology entitled Chao Yin(Voice of the tide). In 1911 or 1912, Su wrote and published his first as well as a most celebrated semi-autobiographical romance novel, Duan Hong Ling Yan Ji (The Lone Swan).

Literature work

Duan Hong Ling Yan Ji 

The Duan Hong Ling Yan Ji (Chinese: 斷鴻零雁記; pinyin: duàn hóng líng yàn jì) was written in classical literary styles and translated into English by George Kin Leung as The Lone Swan in 1929. The novel depicts tragic love stories between a young man and two young ladies, both of whom  wholeheartedly fall in love with him. The young man is a monk just like Su, who cannot marry either of the two young ladies, which results in a tragic ending.  The similarity between the novel with The Dream of the Red Chamber has led scholars to conclude that Su was much influenced by it. And The Lon Swan is one of the forefathers of the Mandarin Ducks and Butterflies school.

Selected  Poems of Lord Byron 

The Selected Poems of Lord Byron (Chinese: 拜倫詩選; pinyin: bài lún shī xuǎn) was published in the Chinese empire Hsuantung the first year (in 1909) and translated into Chinese in the form of classical Chinese poetry such as  The Isles of Greece and My Native Land, Good Night.

Les Miserables 
The translation of Les Miserables was published in the Chinese empire Guangxu 29th year (in 1903). It was serialized in 國民日日報 (English: The China National Gazette ) with a translated title 慘社會 (English: Miserable Society) in Shanghai.

Influences

New Culture Movement and May Fourth Movement 
Su was involved in revolutionary activity against the Qing Dynasty writing articles and papers. His poems integrated the core of classical Chinese literature and his collocation influenced the New Culture Movement in the early years of the Republic of China. His novels echoed those of the May Fourth Movement writers in criticism of the traditional family. Like writers such as Hu Shi, Wu You and Ba Jin, Su depicted family as an arena beset with cruelty, where authorities abused the younger generations for their own self-interests. He showed how family authority can inflict pain on young people by preventing their desire for romantic love. Although he focused on the pains of the sentimental characters’ personalities, he advocated that individuals could pursue what they wanted.

Further reading

Su Manshu quan ji 
Su Man-shu quan ji was written by Liu Yazi and Liu Wuchi, is a collection of Su Manshu's works, including poetry, novels, letters, miscellaneous essays, poetry translation and novel translation. The book is the most comprehensive collection of Su's literature works.

References 

1884 births
1918 deaths
Qing dynasty poets
Qing dynasty Buddhist monks
People from Yokohama
Chinese revolutionaries
Republic of China Buddhist monks
Chinese people of Japanese descent
Qing dynasty essayists
Qing dynasty translators
20th-century poets
Republic of China Buddhists
Republic of China novelists
Republic of China translators
Republic of China essayists
20th-century Chinese translators
19th-century Chinese translators
20th-century essayists
Writers from Kanagawa Prefecture
20th-century Buddhist monks